Qeshlaq-e Hezarat Qoli Gholam (also Romanized as Qeshlāq-e Ḩez̤arat Qolī Gholām) is a village in Qeshlaq-e Jonubi Rural District, Qeshlaq Dasht District, Bileh Savar County, Ardabil Province, Iran. At the 2006 census, its population was 75, in 17 families.

References 

Towns and villages in Bileh Savar County